Canonsleigh Abbey was an Augustinian priory in the parish of Burlescombe, Devon.

History
It was founded in about 1170 by Walter de Claville, lord of the manor of Burlescombe, for the Augustinian canons regular as the Priory of the Blessed Virgin Mary and Saint John the Evangelist. He appears to have been a descendant of Walter I de Claville (floruit 1086), one of the 52 Devon Domesday Book tenants-in-chief of King William the Conqueror, who had 32 landholdings in Devon. The original Anglo-Saxon name of the site donated by Walter II, perhaps a sub-manor of Burlescombe, was "Leigh" (Domesday Book Leige), which after the foundation of the Abbey became known as "Canons' Leigh" and was Latinised by mediaeval scribes to Leigh Canonicorum (i.e. "Leigh of the canons"),  now "Canonsleigh".

By 1284 the number of canons had declined to seven, and these were evicted in 1285 when the widow Maud de Lacy, Countess of Gloucester(d.1289), formerly the wife of Richard de Clare, 6th Earl of Gloucester (d.1262), refounded the establishment as a nunnery as the Abbey Church of the Blessed Virgin Mary, Saint John the Evangelist and Saint Etheldreda. In 1286 the abbess was granted licence to hold weekly markets. It was not especially wealthy. The number of historical records that survive for this establishment is not large which limits a full knowledge of its history. However recent research by Atkinson has added much to its known history.

Among the possessions of Canonsleigh Abbey was Netherton, Farway

The Abbey was suppressed in 1539 during the Dissolution of the Monasteries. Of its later history, in September 1546 Sir Richard Grenville (c.1495-1550), of Stowe, Cornwall and Bideford, and Roger Blewett of Holcombe Rogus paid nearly £1,170 for the manors of Canonsleigh in Burlescombe and Tynyell in Landulph.

The remains today consist of a small 15th-century gatehouse that has two large blocked arches and, to the east, further fragments that include ruined buildings, the remains of a reredorter and a possible south wall of the eastern range of buildings.

See also 
 Abbeys and priories in England

References

Sources 
 Anthony New, A Guide to the Abbeys of England And Wales, p104. Constable.
 Henry Thorold, The Collins Guide to the Ruined Abbeys of England, Wales and Scotland, Harper Collins, 1985
 Ordnance Survey, Monastic Britain, South Sheet, 2nd Edition.
 The Cartulary of Canonsleigh Abbey (British Library Harleian MS 3660), London, Vera C.M. (Ed.), published in Devon & Cornwall Record Society Publications, new series, vol.8, London, 1965

Further reading

Perceval, Charles Spencer, Remarks on some Early Charters and Documents relating to the Priory of Austin Canons and Abbey of Austin Canonesses at Canonsleigh, in the County of Devon, In a letter from CHARLES SPENCER PERCEVAL, Esq. LL.D. F.S.A. to AUGUSTUS WOLLASTON FRANKS, Esq. M.A. Director. Published in: Archaeologia, or, Miscellaneous tracts relating to antiquity, Society of Antiquaries of London, Vol.40, read 10 May 1866, Chapter 29, pp. 416–450.
Elworthy, Frederick Thomas, "Canonsleigh", published in: Transactions of the Devonshire Association for the Advancement of Sciences etc., 1892, pp. 359–376
 – contains many photographs of the site.

Monasteries in Devon
Augustinian monasteries in England
Augustinian nunneries in England
Religious organizations established in the 1170s
Christian monasteries established in the 12th century
1170s establishments in England
1539 disestablishments in England